Ljubomir Marić (18 January 1878 – 11 August 1960) was a Serbian military officer and a Yugoslav army general, who served as the Chief of the General Staff of the Royal Yugoslav Army from 12 May 1935 to 8 March 1936, and as the Minister of the Army and Navy of the Kingdom of Yugoslavia from 8 March 1936 to 25 August 1938. He was also a professor at the Military Academy.

Gallery

References

Literature

1878 births
1960 deaths
People from the Principality of Serbia
People from Zlatibor District
Serbian military personnel of the Balkan Wars
Serbian military personnel of World War I
Army general (Kingdom of Yugoslavia)
Recipients of the Order of the Yugoslav Crown
Recipients of the Order of St. Sava
Burials at Belgrade New Cemetery